The Allen House (also known as the Henry J. Allen House and the Allen–Lambe House) is a Prairie Style home in Wichita, Kansas, designed by Frank Lloyd Wright in 1915 for former Kansas Governor Henry Justin Allen and his wife, Elsie.

Description and history 
It was one of Frank Lloyd Wright's last Prairie Houses. The design influence of the prairie and Japanese architecture (Wright was working on the Imperial Hotel in Japan at the time) is apparent on both the exterior and interior.

Also included in the forward-thinking house were such modern conveniences as a central vacuuming unit, an alarm system and gas fireplace logs. Another innovation was the first firewall in a residential home. The bricks contain iron, giving it a rust color.

It is currently run by the Allen House Foundation as a museum under the stewardship of the Wichita Center for the Arts. The house was listed on the National Register of Historic Places on March 7, 1973.

References

 Storrer, William Allin. The Frank Lloyd Wright Companion. University Of Chicago Press, 2006,  (S.205)

External links

 Allen House Foundation

Houses completed in 1917
Frank Lloyd Wright buildings
Historic house museums in Kansas
Houses on the National Register of Historic Places in Kansas
Museums in Wichita, Kansas
Prairie School architecture in Kansas
Houses in Sedgwick County, Kansas
National Register of Historic Places in Wichita, Kansas